Martin Damm and Robert Lindstedt were the defending champions. Both were present, but chose not compete together this year.
Damm partnered with Filip Polášek, but lost in the first round to Marcel Granollers and Tommy Robredo.
Lindstedt partnered with Julian Knowle, but lost in the first round to Thomaz Bellucci and André Sá.

Marcus Daniell and Horia Tecău won the final, 7–5, 6–4, against Marcelo Melo and Bruno Soares.

Seeds

Draw

Draw

External links
 Main Draw Doubles

Heineken Open - Doubles
2010 Heineken Open